The 1907–08 season was the 37th season of competitive football in England. Manchester United were Football League champions for the first time, while Bradford City won the Second Division and Wolverhampton Wanderers won the FA Cup. The Home Championship was shared between England and Scotland.

FA Cup

Wolverhampton Wanderers won the FA Cup for the second time, beating  Newcastle United 3–1 in the final.

Football League

Fulham and Oldham Athletic replaced Burslem Port Vale and Burton United in the Football League.

First Division

Second Division

National team
The England national football team were joint winners in the 1908 British Home Championship. England and Scotland shared the trophy, having each beaten Wales and Ireland in their opening matches before drawing 1–1 with each other in the final game.

England began the strongest side, although all four teams played well in their opening games, both Ireland and Wales running their opponents close. In the second matches however, England and Scotland's quality told, as England beat Wales 7–1 in Wrexham and Ireland succumbed 5–0 in Dublin.

England followed this tournament by becoming the first Home Nation to play a non-British nation with a tour of Central Europe, playing against Austria twice Hungary and Bohemia. In October the England amateur team followed this by winning gold in the football tournament at the 1908 Olympics, held in London.

Results

European tour

England undertook their first matches against opposition outside the Home Nations, with a summer tour of four games against Central European opposition.

Players
The players chosen for the tour were:

Key
 GK — Goalkeeper
 RB — Right back
 LB — Left back
 CB — Centre back
 CH — Centre half
 LH — Left half
 RH — Right half
 RW — Right winger
 LW — Left winger
 FW — Forward
 CF — Centre forward

Match details

Footnotes